Big Plans for Everybody is the second studio album by the American rock band Let's Active, released in 1986 by I.R.S. Records. It was produced by band leader Mitch Easter at his own Drive-In Studio, in Winston-Salem, North Carolina.

Tracklist 
"In Little Ways" – 3:46
"Talking to Myself" – 3:30
"Writing the Book of Last Pages" – 3:56
"Last Chance Town" – 3:35
"Won't Go Wrong" – 3:21
"Badger" – 3:08
"Fell" – 3:37
"Still Dark Out" – 5:50
"Whispered News" – 4:34
"Reflecting Pool" – 2:26
"Route 67" – 2:47

References

External links 

 

1986 albums
Let's Active albums
I.R.S. Records albums
Albums produced by Mitch Easter